Ernst  Heinrich  Meier (17 May 1813 in Bückeburg  2 March 1866 in Tübingen) was a German orientalist. He published an Indian play, Sakuntala or the Lost Ring. He also published a collection of German folk songs.

Meier collected coins. His collection was purchased by the University of Tübingen.

References

1813 births
1866 deaths
People from Bückeburg
German orientalists
German male non-fiction writers